New Mosque is a Sunni Muslim Mosque in Kumanovo, North Macedonia.

See also
Muftiship of Kumanovo
Macedonian Muslims
Islam in North Macedonia
Islamic Religious Community of Macedonia

References

Buildings and structures in Kumanovo
Mosques in North Macedonia